Sir Dickson Poon   (born 19 June 1956) is a Hong Kong businessman in the luxury goods retailing sector. Poon is the executive chairman of his Hong Kong based and listed company Dickson Concepts (DCIL), which owns companies including Harvey Nichols and S. T. Dupont. Through trusts, he controls 40.13% of the voting capital of DCIL as of 31 March 2008.

Film
Along with Sammo Hung, Poon founded D&B Films Co., Ltd which released action and martial arts motion pictures such as the In the Line of Duty series, Hong Kong 1941, Legacy of Rage and more than 50 other titles. The company's last production, "Black Cat II: Assassination of President Yeltsin" (Hei mao zhi ci sha Ye Li Qin), was in 1992.

Personal life
Poon's first marriage was to Marjorie Yang, daughter of Hong Kong textile magnate Y. L. Yang (Yang Yuan-Loong), and chairwoman of the Esquel Group. They have a daughter, Dee Poon Chu-ying.

In 1984, Poon's company signed the then-21-year-old Miss Malaysia, Michelle Yeoh, to appear in a television ad opposite Jackie Chan.  That appearance, with Poon's help, subsequently helped to launch Yeoh's motion picture career with the 1985 martial arts film Yes, Madam. Four years later, in February 1988, Yeoh suspended her movie career to marry Poon. She resumed it three-and-a-half years later when the couple separated in 1991.

He married his third wife Kwai-chu "Pearl" Yu in 1992. They have four children, daughters Daryl and Dana and sons Pearson and Dexter. Pearson, a Cambridge graduate, was appointed as an Executive Director of Dickson Concepts on 14 December 2018.

Academic gifts
In November 2010 Poon donated 10 million to St Hugh's College, Oxford for the construction of the Dickson Poon China Centre, which will bring together, for the first time, academics from a range of research interests related to China, provide accommodation for the college's postgraduate students, and house the Chinese Collection of the Bodleian Library.

Poon's donation to St. Hugh's College was followed two years later by a 20 million GBP donation to King's College London to fund the existing law faculty. It was the largest donation by an individual to the University in its history. In recognition of his donation, the law school at King's College London was renamed The Dickson Poon School of Law.

Awards
Dickson Poon was knighted in the 2015 New Year Honours for services to business and charity, especially higher education.

References

External links

1956 births
Businesspeople awarded knighthoods
Chinese businesspeople in fashion
Commanders of the Order of the British Empire
Hong Kong chief executives
Living people
Knights Bachelor
Recipients of the Silver Bauhinia Star
Fellows of King's College London